Anzhelo Alexandrov Kyuchukov (born 2 October 1972) is a former Bulgarian footballer.

References

1972 births
Living people
Bulgarian footballers
First Professional Football League (Bulgaria) players
PFC Marek Dupnitsa players
PFC Minyor Pernik players
PFC Velbazhd Kyustendil players
PFC Lokomotiv Plovdiv players
Association football midfielders
People from Dupnitsa
Sportspeople from Kyustendil Province